21 Yateley Road, Edgbaston, Birmingham, England is a house built in 1899. It was designed by Herbert Tudor Buckland as his own home, and built by his partnership, Buckland & Haywood-Farmer, which constructed some of the best housing in the Birmingham suburbs in the early 20th century. The architectural style is Arts and Crafts and the house is a Grade I listed building.

History
Over a period of some three hundred years, the city of Birmingham expanded from a West Midlands town with few natural advantages into England's second city and "one of the greatest manufacturing centres in the world". The later 19th century saw major growth of the city's suburbs, including that of Edgbaston, to the south-west of the city centre. The area largely belonged to the Gough-Calthorpe family which presided over sensitive development aimed at the city's affluent middle and upper classes. The city's architects developed a distinctive regional variant of the Arts and Crafts architectural style, inspired by William Lethaby's The Hurst at Four Oaks, Sutton Coldfield, and culminating in the Bournville model village developed by the Cadbury family of chocolate manufacturers.

Herbert Tudor Buckland (1869-1951) was firmly in this architectural tradition and over the course of a career spent largely in Birmingham, he developed a substantial practice. In 1899, he undertook the construction of a house for himself, 21 Yateley Road, which remained his home until his death. The garden was laid out to a plan devised by Gertrude Jekyll. The house remains a private residence.

Architecture and description
The Arts and Crafts architectural style in domestic architecture was championed by Edwin Lutyens and popularised by his friend, collaborator and client, Edward Hudson, the owner of Country Life. The style caught hold in the English suburbs; Peter Davey, in his study Arts and Crafts Architecture, notes that "the architecture of Voysey, Baillie Scott, Parker and early Lutyens lives on in endless copies of hips and gables, half-timbering and harling, mullions and leaded bay windows". This composite description covers many of the features of Buckland's house. Of two storeys, with attics, it has a wide hipped roof, an off-centre gable and is constructed of pebbledashed brick. The interiors are largely unaltered and comprise many Arts and Crafts elements, including woodwork, plasterwork, stained glass and original fireplaces with copper overmantels. The house was referenced, and illustrated, by Hermann Muthesius in his Landhaus und Garten published in 1907. In his 2007 Birmingham volume of the Pevsner Architectural Guides, Andy Foster describes 21 Yateley Road as "especially fine". In his new volume, Birmingham and the Black Country, published in April 2022, Foster provides a detailed commentary on the house. He notes the building's "up-to-date Continental air" and the similarities to Garth House, by Buckland's Birmingham's contemporary, William Bidlake.

21 Yateley Road is a Grade I listed building.

Notes

References

Sources
 
 
 
 
 
 
 
 
 

Edgbaston, Yateley Road, 21
Grade I listed houses
Houses completed in 1899
Arts and Crafts architecture in England
Edgbaston
Architects from Birmingham, West Midlands
Welsh architects